Ricardo Cortés (born 24 January 1980) is a Mexican former professional boxer who competed from 2000 to 2009. He held the IBA Americas super middleweight title.

Professional career
On February 1, 2008 Cortes lost by first round knockout to top Light Middleweight prospect Alfredo Angulo.

References

External links

Boxers from Michoacán
Light-middleweight boxers
Middleweight boxers
1980 births
Living people
Mexican male boxers